Asthenotricha malostigma is a moth in the family Geometridae first described by Louis Beethoven Prout in 1921. It is found in the Democratic Republic of the Congo.

References

Moths described in 1921
Asthenotricha
Insects of the Democratic Republic of the Congo
Moths of Africa
Endemic fauna of the Democratic Republic of the Congo